Type 55 may refer to:

Polaroid type 55, a type of film
The Bugatti Type 55, a racing car
Type 55 flour, the standard hard-wheat flour for baking pastries
The Cadillac Type 55, an antique luxury car
A Chinese variant of the 61-K
A Chinese variant of the 120-PM-43 mortar
Type 055 destroyer, a chinese warship class